Korihait is a Finnish basketball team from Uusikaupunki. It was formed as Uudenkaupungin Urheilijat, shortly UU, in 1898 and has won one Korisliiga Finnish Championship (1990) and two Finnish Cups (1986, 1988). In 1994 UU had financial problems and entered bankruptcy. Korihait then took UU's place in the league.

The club play at Pohitullin Sports Hall, which has also hosted the Finland men's national handball team.

Players

Notable players

References

External links 
 

Basketball teams in Finland
Uusikaupunki
1994 establishments in Finland
Basketball teams established in 1994